Allium dumetorum is a Middle Eastern species of onion found in Israel, Palestine, Lebanon and Jordan. It is a bulb-forming perennial with a few pinkish flowers; ovary pale green.

References

Bibliography 

 

dumetorum
Onions
Plants described in 1948